Price of Love may refer to:

 "Price of Love" (Bad English song), a 1990 song
 "Price of Love", a 2003 song from the album Client by Client
 Price of Love (film), a 2015 Ethiopian film

See also: The Price of Love (disambiguation)